Die Slow may refer to:

 "Die Slow", a song by Lil Durk from Love Songs 4 the Streets 2 (2019)
 "Die Slow", a song by Young Thug and Strick from Punk (2021)